"Beds Are Burning" is a 1987 song by the Australian rock band Midnight Oil, the first track from their album Diesel and Dust. This song was released as the second single from the album.
It reached No. 1 in New Zealand, South Africa and Canada, No. 3 in the Netherlands, No. 5 in France, No. 6 in the United Kingdom,  Australia and Ireland, No. 17 in the United States and Sweden.

It is one of The Rock and Roll Hall of Fame's 500 Songs that Shaped Rock and Roll and it was named number 95 on VH1's 100 Greatest One Hit Wonders of the 80s and number 97 by the Triple J Hottest 100 of All Time in 2009.

In May 2001, Australasian Performing Right Association (APRA) celebrated its 75th anniversary by naming the Best Australian Songs of all time, as decided by a 100 strong industry panel. "Beds Are Burning" was declared third behind the Easybeats' "Friday on My Mind" and Daddy Cool's "Eagle Rock".

In January 2018, as part of Triple M's "Ozzest 100", the 'most Australian' songs of all time, "Beds Are Burning" was ranked number 9.

Composition
After Midnight Oil toured through the Outback in 1986, playing to remote Aboriginal communities and seeing first hand the seriousness of the issues in health and living standards, Peter Garrett, Jim Moginie and Rob Hirst wrote "Beds Are Burning" to criticize how said populations were often forcibly removed from their lands, highlighted by the pre-chorus lines "it belongs to them, let's give it back". Considering such a local affair inspired a worldwide hit, Garrett commented "Who would have thought an Aboriginal land rights song would travel that far?" There are specific references to certain Australian places and politics, such as Kintore Ranges and the town of Yuendumu, vehicles produced by the Holden company, the "It's Time" slogan and the notion of "fair go".

Track listings

Charts

Weekly charts

Year-end charts

Certifications and sales

Live version

A live recording from 1989 was released in 1992, as the second and final single from the band's compilation of live recordings album, Scream in Blue.

Track listing

Cover versions
In 2001, a cover of "Beds Are Burning" was included on the eponymous Underground Moon album, a one-off modern rock project by former War & Peace band mates, Jeff Pilson (Foreigner, Dokken), using the pseudonym Dominic Moon, and Tommy Henriksen (Alice Cooper, Warlock).
On 2 October 2009, 60 musicians and celebrities from around the world released a free reworked version to highlight climate change issues before the United Nations' talks in Copenhagen. Singers included Lily Allen, Klaus Meine of the Scorpions, Simon Le Bon from Duran Duran, Tyson Ritter of The All-American Rejects and Bob Geldof. The former UN secretary-general Kofi Annan, Archbishop Desmond Tutu and the French actress Marion Cotillard also added their voices to the cover version. The song is part of Global Humanitarian Forum TckTckTck Time for Climate justice campaign and is a part of the greater "TckTckTck" project, which aims to draw attention to what they perceive as the urgency of global warming, by signing a "musical petition" with each download.
On 1 May 2018, Canadian hardcore punk band Comeback Kid released a beefed up version of the song on a digital/7-inch release along with a new original song "Little Soldier".
On 18 February 2020, US musician Amanda Palmer released a version of the song, as the lead single from her album Forty-Five Degrees - A Bushfire Charity Flash Record. Palmer's version features Missy Higgins, Brian Viglione and Jherek Bischoff.
On 18 February 2020, Australian Julia Stone released a version of the song. The song is the lead single from the 2020 various artists compilation album Songs for Australia.
On 25 February 2022, American band Awolnation released a cover of the song in collaboration with Tim McIlrath of Rise Against. The song is the second release for the album of covers My Echo, My Shadow, My Covers, set for release on 6 May 2022.
A bilingual Arrernte-English version was released by Northern Territory band Southeast Desert Metal in July 2022.

See also
List of number-one singles of 1988 (Canada)
List of number-one singles from the 1980s (New Zealand)

References

1987 singles
1992 singles
1987 songs
APRA Award winners
ARIA Award winners
Songs about indigenous peoples
Songs about Australia
Songs against racism and xenophobia
Columbia Records singles
Midnight Oil songs
Number-one singles in New Zealand
Number-one singles in South Africa
RPM Top Singles number-one singles
Songs written by Jim Moginie
Songs written by Peter Garrett
Songs written by Rob Hirst